Hyalomma is a genus of hard-bodied ticks common in Asia, Europe, and North Africa. They are also found in Southern Africa. The name is derived from Greek: hyalos (ὕαλος) crystal, glass; and omma (oμμα) eye.

The genus is believed to originate from the area of the present-day Iran or the southern part of the former Soviet Union, having then had spread further into Asia, including the Middle East, and to southern Europe and Africa.

Hyalomma are larger in size and do not have protective shields (indistinct festoons), but have eyes and banded legs. Hyalomma species are difficult to identify due to their hybridization and genetic and morphological variations, caused by harsh environmental conditions and lack of food sources. Hyalomma species are the only ticks to live in such harsh desert conditions. With few hosts available, they are required to be active as soon as a potential host is sensed.

Adult Hyalomma can bite humans and transmit serious pathogens. Immature (nymph) Hyalomma usually feed on birds, rodents, and hares and can be the cause of viral disease and rickettsias. Nymphs are often transmitted from one place to another by migrating birds. For example, a migrating bird carrying a Hyalomma marginatum nymph can cause Crimean-Congo hemorrhagic fever. Hyalomma species can also transmit rickettsias like Siberian tick typhus, Boutonneuse fever, and Q fever.

Species
 Hyalomma aegyptium Linnaeus, 1758
 Hyalomma albiparmatum Schulze, 1919
 Hyalomma anatolicum, parasite of camel
 Hyalomma anatolicum excavatum
 Hyalomma arabica Pegram, Hoogstraal & Wassef, 1982
 Hyalomma brevipunctata Sharif, 1928
 Hyalomma dromedarii Koch, 1844
 Hyalomma erythraeum Tonelli-Rondelli, 1932
 Hyalomma franchinii Tonelli-Rondelli, 1932
 Hyalomma hussaini Sharif, 1928
 Hyalomma hystricis Dhanda & Raja, 1974
 Hyalomma impeltatum Schulze & Schlottke, 1930
 Hyalomma impressum Koch, 1844
 Hyalomma kumari Sharif, 1928
 Hyalomma lusitanicum Koch, 1844
 Hyalomma marginatum Koch, 1844
 Hyalomma nitidum Schulze, 1919
 Hyalomma punt Hoogstraal, Kaiser & Pedersen, 1969
 Hyalomma rhipicephaloides Neumann, 1901
 Hyalomma schulzei Olenev, 1931
 Hyalomma scupense Schulze, 1919
 Hyalomma sinaii Feldman-Muhsam, 1960
 Hyalomma truncatum Koch, 1844
 Hyalomma turanicum Pomerantsev, 1946

References

External links 
 Tick bite disease in Turkey

Ticks
Acari genera
Ixodidae
Taxa named by Carl Ludwig Koch